Murphy's law is an adage or epigram that is typically stated as: "Anything that can go wrong will go wrong." In some formulations, it is extended to "Anything that can go wrong will go wrong, and at the worst possible time."

History 
The perceived perversity of the universe has long been a subject of comment, and precursors to the modern version of Murphy's law are abundant. Recent significant research in this area has been conducted by members of the American Dialect Society. 

Mathematician Augustus De Morgan wrote on June 23, 1866:
"The first experiment already illustrates a truth of the theory, well confirmed by practice, what-ever can happen will happen if we make trials enough." In later publications "whatever can happen will happen" occasionally is termed "Murphy's law", which raises the possibility—if something went wrong—that "Murphy" is "De Morgan" misremembered (an option, among others, raised by Goranson on the American Dialect Society list).

Society member Stephen Goranson has found a version of the law, not yet generalized or bearing that name, in a report by Alfred Holt at an 1877 meeting of an engineering society.

It is found that anything that can go wrong at sea generally does go wrong sooner or later, so it is not to be wondered that owners prefer the safe to the scientific … Sufficient stress can hardly be laid on the advantages of simplicity. The human factor cannot be safely neglected in planning machinery. If attention is to be obtained, the engine must be such that the engineer will be disposed to attend to it.

American Dialect Society member Bill Mullins has found a slightly broader version of the aphorism in reference to stage magic. The British stage magician Nevil Maskelyne wrote in 1908:

It is an experience common to all men to find that, on any special occasion, such as the production of a magical effect for the first time in public, everything that can go wrong will go wrong. Whether we must attribute this to the malignity of matter or to the total depravity of inanimate things, whether the exciting cause is hurry, worry, or what not, the fact remains.

In 1948, humorist Paul Jennings coined the term resistentialism, a jocular play on resistance and existentialism, to describe "seemingly spiteful behavior manifested by inanimate objects", where objects that cause problems (like lost keys or a runaway bouncy ball) are said to exhibit a high degree of malice toward humans.

In 1949, according to Robert A.J. Matthews in a 1997 article in Scientific American, lay the origin of the name "Murphy's law", whereas the concept itself had already long since been known to humans. As quoted by Richard Rhodes, Matthews said, "The familiar version of Murphy's law is not quite 50 years old, but the essential idea behind it has been around for centuries. […] The modern version of Murphy's Law has its roots in U.S. Air Force studies performed in 1949 on the effects of rapid deceleration on pilots." Matthews goes on to explain how Captain Edward A. Murphy was the eponym, but only because his original thought was modified subsequently into the now established form that is not exactly what he himself had said.

In 1952, as an epigraph to a mountaineering book, John Sack described the same principle as an "ancient mountaineering adage":

Anything that can possibly go wrong, does.

Association with Murphy
Differing recollections years later by various participants make it impossible to pinpoint who first coined the saying Murphy's law. The law's name supposedly stems from an attempt to use new measurement devices developed by Edward A. Murphy. The phrase was coined in an adverse reaction to something Murphy said when his devices failed to perform and was eventually cast into its present form prior to a press conference some months later – the first ever (of many) given by John Stapp, a U.S. Air Force colonel and Flight Surgeon in the 1950s.

From 1948 to 1949, Stapp headed research project MX981 at Muroc Army Air Field (later renamed Edwards Air Force Base) for the purpose of testing the human tolerance for g-forces during rapid deceleration. The tests used a rocket sled mounted on a railroad track with a series of hydraulic brakes at the end. Initial tests used a humanoid crash test dummy strapped to a seat on the sled, but subsequent tests were performed by Stapp, at that time an Air Force captain. During the tests, questions were raised about the accuracy of the instrumentation used to measure the g-forces Captain Stapp was experiencing. Edward Murphy proposed using electronic strain gauges attached to the restraining clamps of Stapp's harness to measure the force exerted on them by his rapid deceleration. Murphy was engaged in supporting similar research using high speed centrifuges to generate g-forces. Murphy's assistant wired the harness, and a trial was run using a chimpanzee.

The sensors provided a zero reading; however, it became apparent that they had been installed incorrectly, with some sensors wired backwards. It was at this point that a disgusted Murphy made his pronouncement, despite being offered the time and chance to calibrate and test the sensor installation prior to the test proper, which he declined somewhat irritably, getting off on the wrong foot with the MX981 team. George Nichols, another engineer who was present, recalled in an interview that Murphy blamed the failure on his assistant after the failed test, saying, "If that guy has any way of making a mistake, he will." Nichols' account is that "Murphy's law" came about through conversation among the other members of the team; it was condensed to "If it can happen, it will happen", and named for Murphy in mockery of what Nichols perceived as arrogance on Murphy's part. Others, including Edward Murphy's surviving son Robert Murphy, deny Nichols' account, and claim that the phrase did originate with Edward Murphy. According to Robert Murphy's account, his father's statement was along the lines of "If there's more than one way to do a job, and one of those ways will result in disaster, then he will do it that way."

The phrase first received public attention during a press conference in which Stapp was asked how it was that nobody had been severely injured during the rocket sled tests. Stapp replied that it was because they always took Murphy's law under consideration; he then summarized the law and said that in general, it meant that it was important to consider all the possibilities (possible things that could go wrong) before doing a test and act to counter them. Thus Stapp's usage and Murphy's alleged usage are very different in outlook and attitude. One is sour, the other an affirmation of the predictable being surmountable, usually by sufficient planning and redundancy. Nichols believes Murphy was unwilling to take the responsibility for the device's initial failure (by itself a blip of no large significance) and is to be doubly damned for not allowing the MX981 team time to validate the sensor's operability and for trying to blame an underling in the embarrassing aftermath.

The association with the 1948 incident is by no means secure. Despite extensive research, no trace of documentation of the saying as Murphy's law has been found before 1951 (see above). The next citations are not found until 1955, when the May–June issue of Aviation Mechanics Bulletin included the line "Murphy's law: If an aircraft part can be installed incorrectly, someone will install it that way", and Lloyd Mallan's book, Men, Rockets and Space Rats, referred to: "Colonel Stapp's favorite takeoff on sober scientific laws—Murphy's law, Stapp calls it—'Everything that can possibly go wrong will go wrong'." The Mercury astronauts in 1962 attributed Murphy's law to U.S. Navy training films.

Fred R. Shapiro, the editor of the Yale Book of Quotations, has shown that in 1952 the adage was called "Murphy's law" in a book by Anne Roe, quoting an unnamed physicist:

he described [it] as "Murphy's law or the fourth law of thermodynamics" (actually there were only three last I heard) which states: "If anything can go wrong, it will."

In May 1951, Anne Roe gives a transcript of an interview (part of a Thematic Apperception Test, asking impressions on a drawing) with Theoretical Physicist number 3: "As for himself he realized that this was the inexorable working of the second law of the thermodynamics which stated Murphy's law 'If anything can go wrong it will'. I always liked 'Murphy's law'. I was told that by an architect." Anne Roe's papers are in the American Philosophical Society archives in Philadelphia; those records (as noted by Stephen Goranson on the American Dialect Society list, December 31, 2008) identify the interviewed physicist as Howard Percy "Bob" Robertson (1903–1961). Robertson's papers are at the Caltech archives; there, in a letter Robertson offers Roe an interview within the first three months of 1949 (as noted by Goranson on American Dialect Society list, May 9, 2009). The Robertson interview apparently predated the Muroc scenario said to have occurred in or after June, 1949.

The name "Murphy's law" was not immediately secure. A story by Lee Correy in the February 1955 issue of Astounding Science Fiction referred to "Reilly's law", which "states that in any scientific or engineering endeavor, anything that can go wrong will go wrong". Atomic Energy Commission Chairman Lewis Strauss was quoted in the Chicago Daily Tribune on February 12, 1955, saying "I hope it will be known as Strauss' law. It could be stated about like this: If anything bad can happen, it probably will."

Arthur Bloch, in the first volume (1977) of his Murphy's Law, and Other Reasons Why Things Go WRONG series, prints a letter that he received from George E. Nichols, a quality assurance manager with the Jet Propulsion Laboratory. Nichols recalled an event that occurred in 1949 at Edwards Air Force Base, Muroc, California that, according to him, is the origination of Murphy's law, and first publicly recounted by USAF Col. John Paul Stapp. An excerpt from the letter reads:

The law's namesake was Capt. Ed Murphy, a development engineer from Wright Field Aircraft Lab. Frustration with a strap transducer which was malfunctioning due to an error in wiring the strain gage bridges caused him to remark – "If there is any way to do it wrong, he will" – referring to the technician who had wired the bridges at the Lab. I assigned Murphy's law to the statement and the associated variations.

Academic and scientific views 
According to Richard Dawkins, so-called laws like Murphy's law and Sod's law are nonsense because they require inanimate objects to have desires of their own, or else to react according to one's own desires.  Dawkins points out that a certain class of events may occur all the time, but are only noticed when they become a nuisance.  He gives as an example aircraft noise interfering with filming.  Aircraft are in the sky all the time, but are only taken note of when they cause a problem.  This is a form of confirmation bias whereby the investigator seeks out evidence to confirm his already formed ideas, but does not look for evidence that contradicts them.

Similarly, David Hand, emeritus professor of mathematics and senior research investigator at Imperial College London, points out that the law of truly large numbers should lead one to expect the kind of events predicted by Murphy's law to occur occasionally.  Selection bias will ensure that those ones are remembered and the many times Murphy's law was not true are forgotten.

There have been persistent references to Murphy's law associating it with the laws of thermodynamics from early on (see the quotation from Anne Roe's book above).  In particular, Murphy's law is often cited as a form of the second law of thermodynamics (the law of entropy) because both are predicting a tendency to a more disorganised state.  Atanu Chatterjee investigated this idea by formally stating Murphy's law in mathematical terms.  Chatterjee found that Murphy's law so stated could be disproved using the principle of least action.

Variations (corollaries) of the law 
From its initial public announcement, Murphy's law quickly spread to various technical cultures connected to aerospace engineering. Before long, variants had passed into the popular imagination, changing as they went.

Author Arthur Bloch has compiled a number of books full of corollaries to Murphy's law and variations thereof. The first of these was Murphy's law and other reasons why things go wrong!.

Yhprum's law, where the name is spelled backwards, is "anything that can go right, will go right" – the optimistic application of Murphy's law in reverse.

Peter Drucker, the management consultant, with a nod to Murphy, formulated "Drucker's Law" in dealing with complexity of management: "If one thing goes wrong, everything else will, and at the same time."

Mrs. Murphy's Law is a corollary of Murphy's Law.  It states that things will go wrong when Mr. Murphy is away, as in this formulation:"Anything that can go wrong will go wrong while Murphy is out of town."

See also 

 Buttered toast phenomenon - Idiom representing pessimistic outlooks.
 Defensive design - Practice of planning for contingencies in the design stage of a project

References

Bibliography 
 
 
 
 
 Matthews received the Ig Nobel Prize for physics in 1996 for this work (see list).
 
 David J. Hand ( 2014). The Improbability Principle: Why Coincidences, Miracles, and Rare Events Happen Every Day, Macmillan,  .
 Richard Dawkins (2012). The Magic of Reality: How We Know What's Really True, Simon and Schuster, .

External links

1952 proverb citation
1955 term citation of phrase "Murphy's law"
Murphy's law entry in the Jargon File
Murphy's Law of Combat
Murphy's Law's Origin 
Reference to 1941 citation of the proverb
The Annals of Improbable Research tracks down the origins of Murphy's law

Adages
Risk